Franklin County is a county in the U.S. state of Ohio. As of the 2020 census, the population was 1,323,807, making it the most populous county in Ohio. Most of its land area is taken up by its county seat, Columbus, the state capital and most populous city in Ohio. The county was established on April 30, 1803, less than two months after Ohio became a state, and was named after Benjamin Franklin. Franklin County originally extended north to Lake Erie before being subdivided into smaller counties. Franklin County is the central county of the Columbus, Ohio Metropolitan Statistical Area.

Franklin County, particularly Columbus, has been a centerpiece for presidential and congressional politics, most notably the 2000 presidential election, the 2004 presidential election, and the 2006 midterm elections. Franklin County is home to one of the largest universities in the United States, Ohio State University, which has about 60,000 students on its main Columbus campus.

It shares a name with Franklin County in Kentucky, where Frankfort is located. This makes it one of two pairs of capital cities in counties of the same name, along with Marion Counties in Indiana and Oregon.

History

On March 30, 1803, the Ohio government authorized the creation of Franklin County. The county originally was part of Ross County. Residents named the county in honor of Benjamin Franklin. In 1816, Franklin County's Columbus became Ohio's state capital. Surveyors laid out the city in 1812, and officials incorporated it in 1816. Columbus was not Ohio's original capital, but the state legislature chose to move the state government there after its location for a short time at Chillicothe and at Zanesville. Columbus was chosen as the site for the new capital because of its central location within the state and access by way of major transportation routes (primarily rivers) at that time. The legislature chose it as Ohio's capital over a number of other competitors, including Franklinton, Dublin, Worthington, and Delaware.

On May 5, 1802, a group of prospective settlers founded the Scioto Company at the home of Rev. Eber B. Clark in Granby, Connecticut, for the purpose of forming a settlement between the Muskingum River and Great Miami River in the Ohio Country. James Kilbourne was elected president and Josiah Topping secretary. On August 30, 1802, James Kilbourne and Nathaniel Little arrived at Colonel Thomas Worthington's home in Chillicothe. They tentatively reserved land along the Scioto River on the Pickaway Plains for their new settlement.

On October 5, 1802, the Scioto Company met again in Granby and decided not to purchase the lands along the Scioto River on the Pickaway Plains, but rather to buy land  farther north from Dr. Jonas Stanbery and his partner, an American Revolutionary War general, Jonathan Dayton.  were purchased along the Whetstone River (now known as the Olentangy River) at $1.50 per acre. This land was part of the United States Military District surveyed by Israel Ludlow in 1797 and divided into townships  square.

Before the state legislature's decision in 1812, Columbus did not exist. The city was originally designed as the state's new capital, preparing itself for its role in Ohio's political, economic, and social life. In the years between the first ground-breaking and the actual movement of the capital in 1816, Columbus and Franklin County grew significantly. By 1813, workers had built a penitentiary, and by the following year, residents had established the first church, school, and newspaper in Columbus. Workers completed the Ohio Statehouse in 1861. Columbus and Franklin County grew quickly in population, with the city having 700 people by 1815. Columbus officially became the county seat in 1824. By 1834, the population of Columbus was 4,000 people, officially elevating it to "city" status.

Geography
The county is located in the Till Plains and the Appalachian Plateau land regions.

The county is drained by the Olentangy River and the Scioto River. Major creeks in the county include Big Darby Creek, Big Walnut Creek, and Alum Creek. There are two large reservoirs in the county, Hoover Reservoir and Griggs Reservoir.

Adjacent counties
 Delaware County (north)
 Fairfield County (southeast)
 Licking County (east)
 Madison County (west)
 Pickaway County (south)
 Union County (northwest)

Major highways

 
 
  (future)

Demographics

2010 census
As of the 2010 census, there were 1,163,414 people, 477,235 households, and 278,030 families living in the county. The racial makeup of the county was 69.2% white, 21.2% black or African American, 3.9% Asian, 0.2% American Indian, 0.1% Pacific islander, 2.3% from other races, and 3.0% from two or more races. Those of Hispanic or Latino origin made up 4.8% of the population. In terms of ancestry, 24.2% were German, 14.4% were Irish, 9.1% were English, 5.5% were Italian, and 5.0% were American.

Of the 477,235 households, 31.0% had children under the age of 18 living with them, 39.0% were married couples living together, 14.4% had a female householder with no husband present, 41.7% were non-families, and 31.9% of all households were made up of individuals. The average household size was 2.38 and the average family size was 3.05. The median age was 33.4 years.

The median income for a household in the county was $49,087 and the median income for a family was $62,372. Males had a median income of $45,920 versus $37,685 for females. The per capita income for the county was $26,909. About 12.1% of families and 17.0% of the population were below the poverty line, including 23.0% of those under age 18 and 9.4% of those age 65 or over.

Economy

Top Employers
According to the county's 2019 Comprehensive Annual Financial Report, the top employers in the county are:

Politics
For most of the 20th century, Franklin County was a Republican bastion, as has long been the case with most of central Ohio. From 1896 to 1992, it went Republican all but five times. However, it has gone Democratic in every election since 1996, reflecting the Democratic trend in most other urban counties nationwide. Columbus and most of its northern and western suburbs lean Democratic, while the more blue-collar southern section of the county leans Republican. From 1996 to 2004, Democratic nominees carried the county by single digit margins, but it swung significantly in favor of Barack Obama in 2008. The county has swung towards Democrats in every subsequent Presidential election, with each candidate breaking the previous county record for both largest Democratic vote share and largest Democratic margin of victory in county history. Most recently, Democratic nominee Joe Biden won the county with 64.7 percent of the vote and a 31.4 percent margin of victory.

In Congress, it is split between two districts. Most of Columbus itself is in the 3rd district, represented by Democrat Joyce Beatty. The southwestern portion is in 15th district, represented by Republican Mike Carey.

|}

Government

Franklin County Officials

Ohio House of Representatives

Ohio State Senate

United States House of Representatives

United States Senate

Communities

Franklin County is currently made up of 16 cities, 10 villages, and 17 townships.

Cities

 Bexley
 Canal Winchester
 Columbus (state capital) (county seat)
 Dublin
 Gahanna
 Grandview Heights
 Grove City
 Groveport
 Hilliard
 New Albany
 Pickerington
 Reynoldsburg
 Upper Arlington
 Westerville
 Whitehall
 Worthington

Villages

 Brice
 Harrisburg
 Lithopolis
 Lockbourne
 Marble Cliff
 Minerva Park
 Obetz
 Riverlea
 Urbancrest
 Valleyview

Townships

 Blendon
 Brown
 Clinton
 Franklin
 Hamilton
 Jackson
 Jefferson
 Madison
 Mifflin
 Norwich
 Perry
 Plain
 Pleasant
 Prairie
 Sharon
 Truro
 Washington
 Montgomery ("paper" township coextensive with the city of Columbus)

https://web.archive.org/web/20160715023447/http://www.ohiotownships.org/township-websites

Defunct Townships
 Marion (completely annexed by the city of Columbus)

Census-designated places

 Blacklick Estates
 Darbydale
 Huber Ridge
 Lake Darby
 Lincoln Village

Other unincorporated communities

 Amlin
 Blacklick
 Flint
 Galloway
 Georgesville
 New Rome
 Oakland

Education
School districts include:

City school districts:

 Bexley City School District
 Columbus City School District
 Dublin City School District
 Gahanna-Jefferson City School District
 Grandview Heights City School District
 Hilliard City School District
 Reynoldsburg City School District
 South-Western City School District
 Upper Arlington City School District
 Westerville City School District
 Whitehall City School District
 Worthington City School District

Local school districts:

 Canal Winchester Local School District
 Groveport Madison Local School District
 Hamilton Local School District
 Jonathan Alder Local School District
 Licking Heights Local School District
 Madison-Plains Local School District
 New Albany-Plain Local School District
 Olentangy Local School District
 Pickerington Local School District
 Teays Valley Local School District

State-operated schools include:
 Ohio State School for the Blind
 Ohio School for the Deaf

See also
 National Register of Historic Places listings in Franklin County, Ohio

Footnotes

Further reading
 Henry Howe, History of Franklin County, Ohio, 1803-1889.  Knightstown, IN: Bookmark, 1977.
 William T. Martin, History of Franklin County: A Collection of Reminiscences of the Early Settlement of the County: With Biographical Sketches and a Complete History of the County to the Present Time. Columbus, OH: Follett, Forster & Co., 1858.
 Opha Moore, History of Franklin County, Ohio. In Two Volumes. Topeka: Historical Publishing Company, 1930.
 William Alexander Taylor, Centennial History of Columbus and Franklin County, Ohio. Chicago: S. J. Clarke Publishing Co., 1909.
 A Centennial Biographical History of the City of Columbus and Franklin County, Ohio... Chicago: Lewis Publishing Co., 1901.

External links

 
  Franklin County history Provided by Ohio History Central

 
1803 establishments in Ohio
Ohio counties
Columbus metropolitan area, Ohio
Populated places established in 1803